In climbing, a support for the toe of the foot, to aid in ascent
 Metaphorically, any small step which allows one to move toward a greater goal
 In grappling, a type of ankle lock.